Locke & Key is an American fantasy horror drama television series developed by Carlton Cuse, Meredith Averill, and Aron Eli Coleite, based on the comic-book series of the same name by Joe Hill and Gabriel Rodríguez. It premiered on Netflix on February 7, 2020. The series stars Darby Stanchfield, Connor Jessup, Emilia Jones, Jackson Robert Scott, Laysla De Oliveira, Petrice Jones, and Griffin Gluck.

In December 2020, ahead of the second season premiere on October 22, 2021, the series was renewed for a third season which premiered on August 10, 2022. In April 2022, it was announced that the third season would be its final season, as originally planned by the creators.

Premise
After Rendell Locke is murdered at the hands of former student Sam Lesser, his wife Nina decides to move with her three children, Tyler, Kinsey, and Bode, from Seattle to Matheson, Massachusetts, and take residence in Rendell's family home, Keyhouse. The children soon discover a number of mysterious keys throughout the house that can be used to unlock various doors in magical ways. They soon become aware of a demonic entity that is also searching for the keys for its own malevolent purposes.

Cast and characters

Main

 Darby Stanchfield as Nina Locke, the Locke family matriarch who moves to Keyhouse with her children following the death of her husband
 Connor Jessup as Tyler Locke, the Locke family's eldest son
 Emilia Jones as Kinsey Locke, the Locke family's middle child and only daughter
 Jackson Robert Scott as Bode Locke, the Locke family's youngest son
 Petrice Jones as Scot Cavendish (seasons 1–2; recurring season 3), a British student filmmaker at Matheson Academy, leader of the Savini Squad and Kinsey's love interest
 Laysla De Oliveira as Dodge (season 1, guest seasons 2–3), the "well lady" of Keyhouse who is revealed to be a demonic entity
 Griffin Gluck as Gabe (seasons 1–2; guest season 3), Dodge's male persona who poses as a student at Matheson Academy
 Aaron Ashmore as Duncan Locke (season 2, recurring seasons 1, 3), Rendell's younger brother who used to live in Keyhouse
 Hallea Jones as Eden Hawkins (season 2, recurring season 1; guest season 3), Jackie's best friend at Matheson Academy. She is possessed by a demon at the end of the first season.
 Brendan Hines as Josh Bennett (seasons 2–3), the history teacher at Matheson Academy and Nina's love interest. He is also a descendant of Frederick Gideon.
 Kevin Durand as Frederick Gideon (season 3, recurring season 2), a captain in the British Army during the American Revolutionary War who was the first person to discover the portal behind the Black Door and become possessed by a demon. At the end of the second season, he is summoned to Earth as an echo by Eden.
 Sherri Saum as Ellie Whedon (season 3; recurring season 1; guest season 2), the physical education teacher at Matheson Academy, an old friend of Rendell's and one of the former Keepers of the Keys
 Coby Bird as Rufus Whedon (season 3; recurring season 1; guest season 2), Ellie's adopted son and the groundskeeper of Keyhouse who befriends Bode. He is fascinated by the army and weapons.

Recurring
 Bill Heck as Rendell Locke (season 1; guest seasons 2–3), the deceased Locke family patriarch who used to live in Keyhouse and one of the former Keepers of the Keys
 Thomas Mitchell Barnet as Sam Lesser (season 1; guest seasons 2–3), Rendell's former student who shoots and kills him, leading to Sam's incarceration. After going through the ghost door he became trapped on the grounds of Keyhouse as a ghost, but eventually possessed the body of one of Gideon's underlings.
 Genevieve Kang as Jackie Veda (seasons 1–2), Tyler's crush at Matheson Academy and eventual girlfriend. She is later possessed by a demon by Dodge using the Demon Key.
 Kevin Alves as Javi (seasons 1–2), Tyler's friend who is on the hockey team with him at Matheson Academy. He is later possessed by a demon by Dodge using the Demon Key.
 Kolton Stewart as Brinker Martin (seasons 1–2), Javi's friend and head of the school hockey team at Matheson Academy
 Asha Bromfield as Zadie Wells, one of Scot's friends and member of the Savini Squad
 Jesse Camacho as Doug Brazelle, one of Scot's friends and cameraman for the Savini Squad
 Eric Graise as Logan Calloway (season 1; guest seasons 2–3), a student at Matheson Academy who befriends Tyler
 Felix Mallard as Lucas "Dodge" Caravaggio (season 1; guest season 2), Rendell's best friend from high school, Dodge's original host, and one of the former Keepers of the Keys
 Steven Williams as Joe Ridgeway (season 1), the school principal and Tyler's English teacher at Matheson Academy
 Martin Roach as Daniel Matuku (seasons 1–2), a detective in Matheson investigating the strange occurrences at Keyhouse. He is later possessed by a demon by Dodge using the Demon Key.
 Chris Britton as Chamberlin Locke (season 2; guest seasons 1, 3), the great-great-grandfather of the Locke children who remains at Keyhouse as a ghost
 Michael Therriault as Gordie Shaw (season 3; guest season 2), Rendell and Ellie's former classmate who loves the performing arts and theatre
 Ian Lake as James Bolton (season 3; guest season 2), a Revolutionary War soldier serving under Gideon. In the third season, he is summoned to Earth as an echo.
 Jeff Lillico as Samuel Coffey (season 3; guest season 2), a Revolutionary War soldier serving under Gideon. In the third season, he is summoned to Earth as an echo.

Episodes

Series overview

Season 1 (2020)

Season 2 (2021)

Season 3 (2022)

Production

Background

Locke & Key was originally developed as a television series by the Fox broadcast network during the 2010–11 television season by DreamWorks Television and 20th Century Fox Television with Josh Friedman writing the pilot script adaptation. Alex Kurtzman and Roberto Orci served as executive producers for the pilot, which starred Mark Pellegrino, Miranda Otto, Jesse McCartney, Sarah Bolger, Skylar Gaertner, and Nick Stahl. The pilot was not given a series order by Fox, though it was screened at the 2011 San Diego Comic-Con. At the 2014 San Diego Comic-Con, a feature-film trilogy was announced through Universal Pictures with Kurtzman and Orci expected to serve as executive producers.

Development
On May 9, 2016, IDW Entertainment was reported to be developing a television-series adaptation of Locke & Key again. The novel's writer, Joe Hill, was expected to write the production's pilot and serve as an executive producer. The project was being developed in association with Circle of Confusion with the intent of pitching the series to cable networks and streaming services.

On April 20, 2017, Hulu gave the production a pilot order. The production was developed by Carlton Cuse with Hill and set to be directed by Scott Derrickson. Cuse was expected to serve as the potential series' showrunner and executive producer alongside Hill, Derrickson, Lindsey Springer, Ted Adams, and David Ozer. Production companies involved with the pilot were slated to include Carlton Cuse Productions and IDW Entertainment. On July 14, 2017, it was reported that Andy Muschietti was replacing Derrickson as the pilot's director, as Derrickson was forced to drop out of the production due to a scheduling conflict. On March 27, 2018, it was reported that Hulu had passed on the pilot and declined to order it to series.

On May 29, 2018, the production was reported to be in final negotiations with Netflix for a series order. Netflix redeveloped the property and discarded the prior pilot ordered by Hulu. Due to scheduling conflicts, Andy Muschietti was not expected to direct the production's new pilot, but would continue to serve as executive producer alongside Hill, Cuse, Adams, Ozer, and Barbara Muschietti. Production companies involved with the new iteration of the project were set to include Genre Arts and IDW Entertainment. On July 25, 2018, Netflix officially gave the production a series order for a first season consisting of ten episodes. Aron Eli Coleite, Meredith Averill, and Rick Jacobs were announced as new executive producers. Circle of Confusion was also expected to again act as a production company for the series. The new iteration of the series was created by Hill and developed by Cuse, Coleite, and Averill. The new first episode was written by Hill and Coleite, with Cuse and Averill serving as showrunners. Michael Morris directed the first two episodes and serves as an executive producer.

In adapting the comic for the Netflix series, the fictional town where Keyhouse is located was changed from Lovecraft to Matheson, Massachusetts. According to Cuse and Averill, this change had been suggested by Hill; because of the comic's Lovecraftian themes, the setting's name was to honor author H. P. Lovecraft, but Hill wanted to honor author and screenwriter Richard Matheson for the series, instead.

Despite the fact the series had not yet received an order beyond its first season, writing for a potential second season began ahead of the series' first-season premiere. On March 30, 2020, Netflix renewed the series for a second season. On December 18, 2020, ahead of the second-season premiere, Netflix renewed the series for a third season. On April 6, 2022, it was announced that the third season would be the show's last, and that the series's structure had been planned out after the success of the first season.

Casting
In August 2017, Frances O'Connor and Jackson Robert Scott were cast in the pilot's main roles. In September 2017, Megan Charpentier and Nate Corddry were reported to have joined the pilot's main cast. In October 2017, Jack Mulhern, Danny Glover, and Owen Teague had been cast in starring roles in the pilot.

Alongside the announcement of the production's move to Netflix, it was revealed all of the series' roles would be recast with the exception of Jackson Robert Scott as Bode Locke. On December 19, 2018, Connor Jessup and Emilia Jones were cast to replace Mulhern and Charpentier, respectively. In January 2019, Sherri Saum, Griffin Gluck, Steven Williams (replacing Glover), Darby Stanchfield (replacing O'Connor), Laysla De Oliveira, and Kevin Alves joined the cast with Gluck, Stanchfield, and De Oliveira in main roles and Williams and Alves set to appear in a recurring capacity. In February 2019, Petrice Jones and Thomas Mitchell Barnet (replacing Teague) joined the main cast; Asha Bromfield and Felix Mallard were cast to appear in recurring roles.

Mirroring their appearances as characters in the comic book, creators Joe Hill and Gabriel Rodriguez had cameo appearances in the first-season finale as paramedics.

On September 30, 2020, Aaron Ashmore and Hallea Jones were promoted to series regulars while Brendan Hines was cast as a new series regular for the second season. On October 6, 2021, it was reported that Kevin Durand had joined the cast as a new series regular for the second season. On November 30, 2021, Saum was promoted to a series regular for the third season.

Filming

Principal photography for the series took place from February 11 to July 5, 2019, in Hamilton and Toronto, in Ontario, Canada. Scenes within the fictional Matheson, as well as some other exterior scenes, such as the outside of the Drowning Cave, were filmed in Lunenburg, Nova Scotia. Keyhouse itself was a constructed set and shot at Cinespace Film Studios in Toronto along with other internal scenes. The second season began filming on September 21, 2020, and concluded on April 16, 2021. The third season began filming on May 3, 2021, and concluded on September 17, 2021.

Music 
The score to the show was composed by Torin Borrowdale. When writing the main theme for the series, Borrowdale wanted to elicit a feeling of magic and whimsey that would come with exploring a house with magical keys for the first time. Borrowdale implemented a solo cello in a low register for Dodge's theme to capture both the beauty and the darkness of Dodge's character. For Bode's theme, he created a simple tune that would be adaptable to the varying situations Bode got himself into, in which the variations on his theme would reflect the current mood of the scene. The soundtrack was released on March 13, 2020.

Release
In December 2019, Netflix announced that the series would be released on February 7, 2020, in the US and Canada. On January 8, 2020, Netflix released an official trailer for the series. A world premiere was held on February 5, 2020, in Hollywood, California. The second season was released on October 22, 2021. The third and final season was released on August 10, 2022.

Reception

Audience viewership
In its first four weeks on Netflix, the second season amassed 143million hours watched globally.

Critical response
On the review aggregator website Rotten Tomatoes, the first season has a 66% approval rating with 61 reviews, with an average rating of 6.58/10. The website's critics consensus reads, "Though Locke & Key at times struggles to strike a consistent tone, it captures enough of the essence of its source material to provide a fiendishly fun and sufficiently spooky time." On Metacritic, the first season has a score of 61 out of 100 based on 22 critics, indicating "generally favorable reviews". On Rotten Tomatoes, the second season has an 83% approval rating with 12 reviews, with an average rating of 7.7/10. The website's critics consensus states, "Locke & Key improves in a raucous second season that turns on the charm while leaping from one cliffhanger to the next." On Rotten Tomatoes, the third season holds a 38% approval rating with 8 reviews, with an average rating of 5.8/10.

The series received generally positive reviews from critics, with the score, set design, and visual effects being singled out as highlights of the series. Critics mainly praised the series' handling of themes relating to loss and trauma, as well as its use of horror genre elements, while criticizing the use of teen drama and romance subplots to drag out the story. The performances of Jackson Robert Scott and Laysla De Oliveira received particular praise.

USA Today claimed that the series was "nearly as strong a debut as Stranger Things was in 2016, but it [needed] a few tweaks to jump the hurdle between good and great." IGN credited the series for its portrayal of trauma and its visual effects, and praised the performances of Scott and de Oliveira, while criticizing it for not consistently building tension throughout.

Polygon gave a more negative review, criticizing the decision to make the television adaptation emphasize the coming-of-age story and fantasy elements of the series, while glossing over the horror elements and haunting visuals of the source material. In particular, its review criticized the uninteresting subplots and inconsistent pacing.

Accolades

Notes

References

External links
 
 

2020 American television series debuts
2022 American television series endings
2020s American drama television series
2020s American horror television series
2020s American supernatural television series
American fantasy drama television series
Demons in television
Dark fantasy television series
Horror drama television series
IDW Publishing adaptations
English-language Netflix original programming
Television shows based on comics
Television series about dysfunctional families
Television series created by Carlton Cuse
Television shows filmed in Toronto
Television shows filmed in Nova Scotia